Tukpa, also known as Nesang, is a Tibetic language spoken in the Lahaul and Spiti region of Himachal Pradesh, India. It forms a closely knit group with other Lahuli–Spiti languages, and is fairly close to Standard Tibetan.

References

Languages of India
Bodish languages
Endangered languages of India